The Cookie Carnival is an animated short produced by Walt Disney Productions and originally released May 25, 1935. It is a Cinderella story involving a cookie girl who wishes to be queen at the cookie carnival, and a homage to the Atlantic City boardwalk parade and bathing beauty contest (what eventually became the Miss America pageant) of the 1920s and 1930s. Contrary to the claim in Film Superlist: 1894-1939, the film is not in the public domain as its copyright was renewed in 1964. It will enter the public domain in 2031 in accordance with current copyright laws.

Plot
Various sweets and goodies of Cookietown are preparing to crown their new cookie queen. A parade of potential candidates passes by, all based on various cakes and sweets. Far from the parade, on what would appear to be the wrong side of the peppermint stick railroad tracks, a gingerbread man overhears a sugar cookie girl crying. Upon hearing that she can't enter the parade, because she doesn't have any clothes that are nice enough to wear for it, he hurries to remedy her situation by concocting a ballgown of cupcake wrappers, colored frosting, and candy hearts. He covers her brown hair with golden taffy ringlets and adds a large, violet bow to her dress as a finishing touch. Thus attired, she is entered as the final contestant in the parade: Ms. Bonbon.

The judges, who have thus far been disappointed in the candidates, all promptly declare Ms. Bonbon the cookie queen on sight. The gingerbread man is practically trampled in the sudden surge of the crowd as they carry Ms. Bonbon to her throne, where they place a golden crown on her head. Then she is presented with a large layer cake, which appears to be a carousel of different vaudeville acts. Every queen needs a king, so the newly crowned cookie queen has to choose a husband from those featured.

After being presented with a duet of tap-dancing candy cane kids, a pair of old-fashioned barbershop cookies, a pair of effeminate angel food cakes, two scat-singing devil food cakes, two acrobatic upside-down cakes, and three tipsy rum cookies, the queen refuses all of them with a giggle and a shake of her head. The judges, with no other suitors to present to her, offer her to marry one of them or all three of them.

At that moment, the gingerbread man, who has been attempting to gain a closer vintage point, sneaks up onto the dais. He is accosted by the guards who split his cupcake paper hat and tear off a piece of the red jelly roll carpet he was hiding under, so that he looks like he is wearing a crown and an ermine-lined cloak. The cookie queen tells the guards to stop and declares the gingerbread man as her king. He is immediately released, and the new king takes his place beside his beloved sugar cookie queen. Their closing kiss melts the lollipop intended to screen them from view.

Characters
Hobo Cookie - voiced by Pinto Colvig. A good-natured wandering homeless gingerbread man who helps a gingerbread woman by giving her a makeover so she can enter the cookie carnival and ending up as the king of the carnival out of gratitude.

Sugar Cookie Girl, (aka Miss Bonbon) - voiced by Shirley Reed. A sad and poor gingerbread woman who wishes to participate in the cookie parade and gets a full makeover by a gingerbread man, ending up as the queen of the Cookie Carnival. In one of the comic adaptations, she is a real princess but decides to pass as a commoner to make sure her husband is good-natured.

The Cookie Carnival Judges, a trio of male gingerbread cookies whose main job is to select the cookie queen in the cookie carnival and suggest her candidates for the title of king.

"Queen of the Cookie Carnival" Contestants
 Miss Peppermint
 Miss Cocoanut
 Miss Banana Cake
 Miss Strawberry Blonde
 Miss Peach (not pictured/possibly cut)
 Miss Licorice
 Miss Pineapple
 Miss Orange Crush (not pictured/possibly cut)
 Miss Jello (The title "Miss" suggests participation in the parade, but it is unclear as she appears after the Cookie Queen is crowned.)

Candy Dates (Cookie King hopefuls)
 Dandy Candy Kids
 Old Fashioned Cookies, a pair of middle-aged cookies.
 Angel Food Cakes, a pair of effeminate cookie angels.
 Devils Food Cakes, a pair of devilish bullies who dance at the rhythm of Jazz and claim to be naughty but nice in order to win the princess hearts. In the comics, one of them serves as the main antagonist to the protagonists.
 Upside Down Cakes
 The Rum Cookies, a trio of drunken cookies who dance erratically.
 Cookie Marching Band
 Cookie Armed Guard

Production
Pinto Colvig, most known as the voice of Goofy, provides the voice of the gingerbread man. Vaudeville was dying out by the time The Cookie Carnival made its debut, but audiences would have been familiar with each of the acts represented by the different cookies.

When Miss Bonbon is being outfitted, she transitions from her cookie-like shape into a more humanoid-appearance (especially apparent between creating her dress and powdering her cheeks). This might make her another early example of visually realistic human characters in Disney shorts, and even a precursor to the Snow White look in Snow White and the Seven Dwarfs.

Comic adaptation
The Silly Symphony Sunday comic strip ran a three-month-long adaptation of The Cookie Carnival called "Cookieland" from April 28 to July 21, 1935.

Home media
The short was released on December 4, 2001 on Walt Disney Treasures: Silly Symphonies - The Historic Musical Animated Classics. Prior to that, the featurette also appeared on the Walt Disney Cartoon Classics Limited Gold Edition: Silly Symphonies VHS in the 1980s. Most recently, "The Cookie Carnival" was released as a segment in 2005's direct-to-video Disney Princess: a Christmas of Enchantment.

References

External links
 
 
 Cookie Carnival at the Encyclopedia of Disney Shorts

1935 films
1935 short films
1930s Disney animated short films
1935 comedy films
Silly Symphonies
1935 animated films
Films directed by Ben Sharpsteen
Films produced by Walt Disney
Films scored by Leigh Harline
American black-and-white films
Cookies in popular culture
Films adapted into comics
1930s American films